John Rhodes Cobb (2 December 1899 – 29 September 1952) was an early to mid 20th century English racing motorist. He was three times holder of the World Land Speed Record, in 1938, 1939 and 1947, set at Bonneville Speedway in Utah, US. He was awarded the Segrave Trophy in 1947. He was killed in 1952 whilst piloting a jet powered speedboat attempting to break the World Water Speed Record on Loch Ness water in Scotland.

Early life
Cobb was born in Esher, Surrey, on 2 December 1899, near the Brooklands motor racing track which he frequented as a boy. He was the son of Florence and Rhodes Cobb, a wealthy furs broker in the City of London. He received his formal education at Eton College and Trinity Hall, Cambridge, before joining his father's firm and pursuing a successful career as the managing director of a number of companies in the trade, the personal financial resources from which he used to fund a passion for large capacity motor high speed racing. In 1924 he acquired a Royal Aero Club aviator's certificate, qualifying as a pilot on a Sopwith Grasshopper.

Racing and speed records career
Cobb won his first track race in a 1911 10-litre Fiat in 1925, and raced in the Higham Special at Brooklands race track in 1926.

In 1928 he privately purchased a 10.5-litre Delage which was imported to England from the factory in Paris, which he raced at Brooklands from 1929 to 1933, breaking the flying start outer lap Record three times in these years, and being clocked at a top speed of 138.88 miles per hour on 2 July 1932. In 1932 he also won the British Empire Trophy at Brooklands.

In 1933 he privately commissioned the design and construction of the 24-litre "Napier Railton" from "Thomson & Taylor", with which he broke a number of track speed records, including setting the ultimate lap record at the Brooklands race track which was never surpassed, driving at an average speed of  achieved on 7 October 1935, having earlier overtaken the 1931 record set by Sir Henry "Tim" Birkin driving Bentley Blower No.1, and regaining it from his friend Oliver Bertram. In the 1934 RAC Tourist Trophy race on the Ards Circuit near Belfast the Lagondas of Cobb and the Hon Brian Lewis competed in the class for larger sports cars against  Eddie Hall in a Bentley.

Driving the piston-engined, wheel-driven Railton Special, he broke the World Land Speed Record at Bonneville salt flats on 15 September 1938 by achieving 350 miles per hour. He broke it a second time at the same site on 23 August 1939, achieving 369 miles per hour.

War service
During World War II, he served as a pilot in the Royal Air Force, and between 1943 and 1945 served with the Air Transport Auxiliary, being demobilised with the rank of Group Captain. He made an (uncredited) appearance in the wartime propaganda film Target for Tonight (1941).

Post-war speed record career and death
Cobb returned to Bonneville salt flats again in 1947, where on 16 September he beat his own standing 1939 World Land Speed Record by reaching  (on one of the two runs he was clocked at having reached ), earning him the press moniker 
"The Fastest Man Alive". This record remained in place until 1963, when it was surpassed by the American Craig Breedlove.

After the 1947 achievement, Cobb turned his mind to becoming on water what he now was on land and went after the simultaneous World Water Speed Record. He commissioned from Vospers the jet-engine powered speedboat Crusader and selected the long water loch of Loch Ness in Scotland for the speed trial. During the run the boat hit an unexplained wake in the water and disintegrated about Cobb. The 1975 Sunn Classic Pictures documentary The Mysterious Monsters offered the theory that the wake was caused by the Loch Ness Monster, or Nessie as it is called, trying to get out of the way of Cobb's boat. His body, which had been thrown  beyond the wreckage, was recovered from the loch, and subsequently conveyed back to his home county of Surrey, where it was buried in the graveyard of Christ Church, Esher. A memorial was subsequently erected on the Loch Ness shore to his memory by the townsfolk of Glenurquhart.

The wreck was filmed by a research team from National Geographic in 2019.

Personal life

John Cobb married Elizabeth Mitchell-Smith in 1947. Elizabeth died from Bright's Disease 14 months later.  In 1950 he married Vera Victoria Henderson (1917–2007).

Cobb resided at 'Grove House' in Esher, an 18th-century mansion, which was demolished in the late 20th century for building development. A public green in Esher (located at 51.37933 -0.36472) was named 'Cobb Green' in tribute to his achievements. In 2013 an archaeological excavation of meadowland at Arran Way at Esher's Lower Green uncovered the foundations of Grove House. In 2017 a Blue plaque was unveiled by Richard Noble to Cobb's memory at the newly re-built Cranmere Primary School which partially occupies the site of the former Grove House estate.

Awards
 British Empire Trophy (1932).
 Segrave Trophy (1947).
 Queen's Commendation for Brave Conduct (1953).

References 

Citations

Bibliography

External links 

The Reluctant Hero by David Tremayne

Location and Google Street View of John Cobb Memorial

Segrave Trophy recipients
BRDC Gold Star winners
Land speed record people
Water speed records
Brooklands people
English racing drivers
British motorboat racers
Brighton Speed Trials people
Recipients of the Queen's Commendation for Brave Conduct
Air Transport Auxiliary pilots
Royal Air Force officers
British World War II pilots
People from Esher
People educated at Eton College
1899 births
1952 deaths
Bonneville 300 MPH Club members
Motorboat racers who died while racing
Sport deaths in Scotland
Grand Prix drivers
Filmed deaths in motorsport